Curiosity is a 2013 album by the American indie rock band Wampire. It was released on May 14, 2013 through Polyvinyl.

Track listing
"The Hearse" 04:40
"Orchards" 02:59
"Spirit Forest" 03:08
"Giants" 04:07
"I Can't See Why" 02:49
"Outta Money" 04:43
"Trains" 03:26
"Snacks" 02:46
"Magic Light" 04:12

Reception

Critical reviews for Curiosity have been positive and the album holds a rating of 69 on Metacritic, based on 14 reviews, indicating "generally favorable" reviews.

References

2013 debut albums
Polyvinyl Record Co. albums
Wampire albums